Nicolás Patiño Sosa (1825 – September 7, 1876) was a Venezuelan military man who participated in the Federal War.

1825 births
1876 deaths
Venezuelan military personnel
People from Lara (state)